Adrian Hobart "Ad" Lindsey (August 15, 1895 – October 2, 1980) was an American football player and coach of football and baseball. He served as the head football coach at Bethany College in Lindsborg, Kansas from 1922 to 1926, at the University of Oklahoma from 1927 to 1931, and at the University of Kansas from 1932 to 1938, compiling a career college football record of 66–64–16. Lindsey was also the head baseball coach at Kansas for one season in 1921, tallying a mark of 13–2.

Coaching career
Lindsey began the 1932 season at Kansas as an assistant to Homer Woodson Hargiss. Hargiss was fired as head football coach on October 10, 1932, two days after the Jawhawks lost at home to Oklahoma, 21–6. Lindsey succeeded Hargiss as acting head coach with athletic director and head basketball coach Phog Allen overseeing the football program in a supervisory role.

Head coaching record

Football

Notes

References

External links
 

1895 births
1980 deaths
American football halfbacks
American football quarterbacks
Bethany Swedes football coaches
Kansas Jayhawks baseball coaches
Kansas Jayhawks football coaches
Kansas Jayhawks football players
Oklahoma Sooners football coaches
People from Vienna, Illinois
People from Lawrence, Kansas